The University of Bergen is a research-intensive state university located in Bergen, Norway. As of 2019, the university has over 4,000 employees and 18,000 students. It was established by an act of parliament in 1946 based on several older scientific institutions dating back to 1825, and is Norway's second oldest university. It is considered one of Norway's four "established universities" and has faculties and programmes in all the fields of a classical university including fields that are traditionally reserved by law for established universities, including medicine and law. It is also one of Norway's leading universities in many natural sciences, including marine research and climate research. It is consistently ranked in the top one percentage among the world's universities, usually among the best 200 universities and among the best 10 or 50 universities worldwide in some fields such as earth and marine sciences. It is part of the Coimbra Group and of the U5 group of Norway's oldest and highest ranked universities.

History 

The university traces its roots to several earlier scientific and scholarly institutions founded in Bergen. Academic activity had taken place in Bergen since the founding of Bergen Cathedral School in 1153, the Seminarium Fredericianum in 1750 and the establishment of the Royal Norwegian Naval Academy in 1817. Academia and higher education would also be significantly advanced in the city with the establishment of Bergen Museum, later renamed University Museum of Bergen, in 1825. Founded by Wilhelm Frimann Christie and Jacob Neumann, the museum became a venue for both research and education specialized on natural science, and featured prominent researcher like Michael Sars, Daniel Cornelius Danielssen and Fridtjof Nansen.

Bergen would eventually become a city with several arenas for higher education and research with the Geophysical Institute being established in 1917, the Chr. Michelsen Institute in 1930, the Norwegian School of Economics in 1936 and finally the university in 1946. The University of Bergen was established by an act of parliament in 1946, as Norway's second university.

Priority areas 
The University of Bergen has three strategic areas

 Marine research
 Climate and energy transition
 Global challenges

Within these areas, UiB will contribute to society with excellent research, education, interdisciplinary cooperation and dissemination of knowledge and innovation.

Organization 

The University of Bergen has an elected rector. The current rector is Margareth Hagen, who was elected rector for a four-year term starting August 1, 2021 after serving as interim rector from January 7, 2021. The university has 7 faculties, the newest being The Faculty of Fine Art, Music and Design which was established in 2017. The University of Bergen Library and the University Museum of Bergen have a faculty-like status. Most of the university campus and administration is located in the Nygård neighbourhood, which has resulted in the campus area often being referred to as Nygårdshøyden or simply Høyden, meaning "the hill".

Ranking 

In 2010 the university was ranked as number 135 worldwide by the Times Higher Education World University Rankings, and 181st worldwide by the 2015/16 QS World University Rankings. UiB was also ranked number 148 worldwide in the July 2010 Webometrics Ranking of World Universities. The URAP (University Ranking by Academic Performance) has ranked UiB for 2014/2015 as the 219th worldwide.

Tuition 

The University of Bergen, in common with other Norwegian universities, does not charge tuition fees, which also applies to international students. Students are however required to be members of the student welfare organisation. As of 2022, this fee (semesteravgift) is NOK 590 (approx. 70 USD) per semester, and provides access to several services, including cultural activities, childcare, refunds for many medical expenses and subsidized accommodation. 40kr of the fee is a donation to the SAIH, a student charity, but this is optional. However most of the students give the donation.

Faculties and academia at the University of Bergen

Faculty of Fine Art, Music and Design 
The Faculty of Fine Art, Music and Design was established on 1 January 2017. It is composed of the earlier Grieg Academy – Department of Music, and the Bergen Academy of Art and Design.

 The Art Academy – Department of Contemporary Art
 The Grieg Academy - Department of Music
 Department of Design

Faculty of Humanities 

 Centre for the Study of the Sciences and the Humanities
 Centre for Women and Gender Research
 Department of Archeology, History, Cultural Studies and Religion (AHKR)
 Department of Foreign Languages (Arabic, English, French, Italian, Japanese, Russian, Spanish, German and single courses in Chinese (IF) 
 Department of Linguistics, Literary and Aesthetical studies (LLE) (Nordic, Comparative Literature, Theatre Studies, Digital Culture, Linguistics, Art History, Classics)
 Department of Philosophy and First Semester Studies (see Examen philosophicum and Examen facultatum) (FOF)
 The Grieg Academy – Department of Music

The faculty revised its structure and names in August 2007.

Faculty of Law 

The Faculty of Law was established as a separate faculty in 1980, with legal studies and research having been conducted at the university since 1969. The faculty is one of three Norwegian institutions which offer legal studies, the other two being the law faculties at the University of Oslo and the University of Tromsø. The faculty offers a five-year programme leading to a Master's degree in law and a three-year PhD programme, and currently has approximately 1900 students.

Faculty of Mathematics and Natural Sciences 

As of January 1, 2018, the faculty is organised into the following seven departments:

 Department of Biological Sciences
 Department of Chemistry
 Department of Earth Science
 Department of Informatics
 Department of Mathematics
 Department of Physics and Technology
 Geophysical Institute

The Faculty is tied to a number of centres:

Centres of Excellence in Research:

 Birkeland Centre for Space Science
 Centre for Geobiology

Centres of Research-based Innovation:

 Sea Lice Research Centre

Centres of Excellence in Education:

 BioCEED

Other important units and centres:

 Sars International Centre for Marine Molecular Biology
 K.G. Jebsen Centre for Deep Sea Research
 Bjerknes Centre for Climate Research
 CBU - Computational Biology Unit
 Norwegian Ocean Observation Laboratory
 Centre for Sustainable Aquaculture Innovations (CSAI)
 Bergen Offshore Wind Centre (BOW)

Faculty of Medicine 

Since January 2013 the faculty is organised in the following departments and units:

 Department of Biomedicine
 Department of Clinical Medicine
 Department of Clinical Science
 Department of Clinical Dentistry
 Department of Global Public Health and Primary Care
 Centre for International Health
 Laboratory Animal Facility

Faculty of Psychology 

The University of Bergen is the only institution in the Nordic countries where the study of psychology has been assigned to its own faculty. Established in 1980, it educates psychologists and is responsible for the university's pedagogic education.

Faculty of Social Sciences 

 Department of Administration and Organization Theory
 Department of Comparative Politics
 Department of Economics
 Department of Geography
 Department of Information Science and Media Studies
 Department of Social Anthropology
 Department of Sociology
 Centre for Development Studies
 Centre for Gender Studies
 Centre for Middle Eastern and Islamic Studies

Notable people

Faculty 
Fredrik Barth, social anthropology
Jan Fridthjof Bernt, law
Margunn Bjørnholt, sociology
Julia Brannen, sociology
Tom Colbjørnsen, sociology
Per Fugelli, medicine
Knut Fægri, botany
Gabriel Gustafson, archeology
Gudmund Hernes, sociology
Helga Hernes, sociology/political science
Georg Johannesen, rhetoric
Stein Kuhnle, sociology/political science
Johan Olsen, political science
Stein Rokkan, sociology/political science
Gunnar Skirbekk, philosophy
Harald Sverdrup, oceanographer and meteorologist
Sigve Tjøtta, mathematics
Frank Aarebrot, comparative politics
Michael Fellows, computer science
Pinar Heggernes, computer science

Alumni 
Knut Olav Åmås, journalist
Erna Solberg, Prime Minister of Norway
Karl Ove Knausgård, author
Torbjørn Mork, Director of the Norwegian Board of Health Supervision
Monica Mæland, Norwegian Minister of Trade and Industry
Leif Ove Andsnes,  Pianist and chamber musician
Jon Fosse, Author and dramatist
Hans-Wilhelm Steinfeld, journalist and writer
Mukhisa Kituyi, Secretary-General UNCTAD
Lars Gule, philosopher and social commentator
Sveinung Rotevatn, Norwegian Minister of Climate and the Environment 
Iselin Nybø, Norwegian Minister of Trade and Industry
Freda Nkirote, Director of the British Institute in Eastern Africa (BIEA) and President of the Pan-African Archaeological Association.

Other notes 

The university also has an Arboretum and Botanical Garden.

References

External links 

 
 All academic units
 List over research groups
 Humanities IT centre
 Wittgenstein Archives of Bergen - Ludwig Wittgenstein

 
1946 establishments in Norway
University of Bergen
Educational institutions established in 1946
Members of the International Science Council
Public universities